Edwin K. Barker (August 8, 1928 – November 29, 2019) was the first principal of Iowa City West High School, and was chosen as one of the 150 most notable people in the 150-year history of Iowa City, Iowa.  He retired as principal in 1979 to pursue business activities.

Early life and education 

Edwin Barker is a native of Indianola, Iowa, where his ancestors were pioneer settlers.  He attended the University of Northern Iowa and served in the U.S. Army as part of the U.S. occupation of Japan.

Career 

Barker was principal of high schools in Coon Rapids, Chariton, and Boone, Iowa, before becoming the first principal of Iowa City West High School in 1968. He received national press coverage due to his innovative disciplinary methods during the 1970s. Time magazine wrote in 1976:

Los Angeles Times syndicated columnist Nick Thimmesch wrote in 1976 that Barker had set up smoking areas on school grounds rather than using up school resources enforcing anti-smoking laws.
Barker was also involved in controversies involving his support for the student council selection of topic "Black America" for a week of educational programs, sex education, which he favored, suspending football players for drinking and the firing of a teacher over inappropriate items posted in a classroom.
Barker retired as principal of West High School in 1979 to manage his apartment business.  In 2011 Barker donated $270,000, the sum of salary payments he received as principal from 1968 to 1979, to West High School for the construction of a soccer field, now named Ed Barker Field.

References 

1928 births
2019 deaths
University of Northern Iowa alumni
Educators from Iowa
People from Indianola, Iowa